Layia chrysanthemoides is a species of flowering plant in the family Asteraceae known by the common name smooth tidytips, or smooth layia.

It is endemic to California, where it lives in several types of habitat along the coast and in inland hills and valleys, and the Central Valley.

Description
This is an annual herb producing an erect, nonglandular stem to a maximum height near half a meter. The leaves are linear or lance-shaped with prickly or fuzzy edges. The lower leaves may be lobed and grow up to about 10 centimeters long.

The flower heads are cups of hairy-edged phyllaries with a fringe of white-tipped golden ray florets around a tightly packed center of yellow disc florets with purple anthers. The fruit is an achene; fruits on the disc florets often have a white bristly pappus.

References

External links
Jepson Manual Treatment
Photo gallery

chrysanthemoides
Endemic flora of California
Natural history of the California chaparral and woodlands
Natural history of the California Coast Ranges
Natural history of the Central Valley (California)
Natural history of the San Francisco Bay Area
Flora without expected TNC conservation status